Blanchard is a city in McClain and Grady counties in the U.S. state of Oklahoma. The population was 8,879 at the 2020 census, up from 7,670 at the 2010 census. Blanchard is part of a rapidly growing area of northern McClain and Grady counties known as the "Tri-City Area" with Newcastle and Tuttle.

History
The center of Blanchard is situated in Township 8 North, Range 4 West, Section 30 in northwestern McClain County. Named after William G. "Bill" Blanchard, the community was organized originally by the Canadian Valley Construction Company, which also planned to build a railroad. However, the company went into bankruptcy, and the railroad came under the control of the Oklahoma Central Railroad which also experienced financial problems. The Atchison, Topeka and Santa Fe Railway took over and completed the line.

The townsite was established by three lot sales beginning with the Canadian Valley Construction Company sale on September 19, 1906. The second sale was held on July 18, 1907, and final lots were sold on March 25, 1908, by the Blanchard Townsite Company. Within a year the town was described as having forty business establishments, including a state and a national bank, four blacksmith shops, three livery barns, two grain elevators, and a weekly newspaper.

Several incorporation dates are reported in various publications about the history of Blanchard, and the town offices as well. The most reliable source seems to be the Blanchard Record of October 25, 1907, which reported, "That Blanchard is now an incorporated town is realized by but a few of our citizens. The petition praying for incorporation was favorably acted upon at the [federal] courts at Chickasha  last week. On or about November 19 notice of an election of officers will be given. In the meantime, candidates will be chosen."

A population of 629 was reported by 1910, and 1,040 in 1930. The Blanchard post office charter was granted by the Post Office Department on December 19, 1906. Mail had previously been received at Womack. When Arthur H. "Art" and Bill Blanchard moved their store from Womack to the new townsite in 1906, they took the post office with them.

In 1909, the Northern District Court was established whereby McClain County was divided into two sections for legal matters for the convenience of the citizens. A courthouse was built in Blanchard, and the first case began on December 13, 1909. The district was disestablished in the late 1920s and combined with District One in Purcell, the county seat. At the turn of the 21st-century legal records could be found at Blanchard.

Geography
Blanchard is located in northwestern McClain County at  (35.148830, −97.650677). The city limits extend west into Grady County.

U.S. Route 62 passes through the center of town as 2nd Street, leading northeast  to the center of Oklahoma City and southwest  to Chickasha. Oklahoma State Highway 76 heads north out of town on Main Street, ending after  in the northern part of Newcastle. Highway 76 leads south  to Lindsay.

Blanchard consists of one square mile "core" of streets roughly laid out in a grid pattern, situated atop a gentle hill surrounded by newer development and agricultural areas within about a  radius of the center. Central Blanchard, located in McClain County, consists of homes (about half built before 1960), several churches and a historic Main Street downtown area. The commercial downtown features antique shops, eating establishments, city services, senior center, and a fitness center.

On the periphery of the city center are schools, businesses, and modern housing subdivisions. These subdivisions tend to be low-density (typically one to  lots.)

While Blanchard is often described as a commuter town with much of its workforce commuting to nearby Norman and Oklahoma City, local businesses are beginning to surge. As of 2008, local amenities included a supermarket, several restaurants, a public library, banks, a large building supply center, a new hardware store, and a large car dealership.

Residents of Blanchard tend to view it as a small-town environment with character and charm, but the rapid growth in the area has brought change. To keep the town from being swallowed by urban sprawl, a large annexation was effected in 2004 to provide Blanchard with a "buffer zone". A Main Street beautification project is underway and infrastructure is being improved to handle the rise in population. In 2007, several older buildings in central Blanchard were removed to allow the widening of U.S. 62, yet the historic downtown commercial buildings were preserved.

Climate

Demographics

As of the 2020 census (and 2021 estimates), there were 8,879 people. The population density was 291.7 people per square mile. The racial makeup of the city was 86.1% White, 2.1% African American, 4.5% Native American, 0.0% Asian, 0.1% from other races, and 6.5% from two or more races. Hispanic or Latino of any race were 4.5% of the population. 1.8% of the population speaks a language other then English. There was 3403 households, the average household size was 2.82. 83.5% of households were occupied by their owners. 32.4% of the homes are worth between $200,000 to $299,999.

In the city, the population was spread out, with 24.7% under the age of 18, 60% from 18 to 64, and 15.3% who were 65 years of age or older. 52.9% of the population is female. The Median Age is 39.8 (37.2 in Oklahoma). 37.7 of the population are not U.S. citizens. 9% of the population are veterans.

The median income for a Non-family household in the city was $51,190, families median income was $95,357, Married-couple families median income was 107,201. 6.9% of the population was below the poverty line, 11.1% under 18 years old.

Education
Blanchard is served by four secondary schools with an average enrollment (as of 2008) of about 1,460 students. The elementary school is of recent construction and houses grades Pre-K through the second. There is also an intermediate school for third thru fifth grade and a middle school for sixth through eighth grades. Brady Barnes is the Superintendent for Blanchard Public Schools.

Blanchard High School is home to "The Lions" football team (class 4A) and has won 2 football state championships 2012(class 3A), and 1979 (class A).  The athletic program also includes baseball won back to back State Championships in 1979 and 1980, and recently adding 2 more state titles in 2015, and 2019 (39-0). Softball won a state championship in 1984 and 2009, basketball, golf, cheerleading, powerlifting and wrestling.  The school also includes a successful Marching band program.

Libraries 
Blanchard is served by the Blanchard Public Library, which is part of the Pioneer Library System spanning many of the suburbs of Oklahoma City.

Culture

Recreation
There are currently two parks in Blanchard as well as an athletic stadium and three nearby golf courses.

Annual festivals include "May Daze" in early May.  Blanchard also boasts one of the largest Veterans' Day Parades in Oklahoma around Veteran's Day.
Blanchard has also built a new high school in 2011.

As of 2022, Blanchard is awaiting construction of a new veterans' memorial.

Media
Residents of Blanchard and nearby Dibble are served by the weekly newspaper The Blanchard News. The radio station KKNG-FM is licensed to Blanchard by the Federal Communications Commission, although only the transmitter is located northeast of Blanchard, while the operating offices and studios are in Oklahoma City.

In Popular Culture
Country music song entitled “Play a Little Haggard Just for Me” by Jeremy Castle pays tribute to country music artists Jody Miller and Bonnie Owens as well as the town of Blanchard, Oklahoma.

Notable people
 Tony K. Burris, Medal of Honor recipient
 Jody Miller, country and pop singer
 Bonnie Owens, country singer

Notes

References

External links
 City of Blanchard official website
 Blanchard Chamber of Commerce
 Blanchard Public Schools
 Blanchard Historical Society
 Encyclopedia of Oklahoma History and Culture - Blanchard

Oklahoma City metropolitan area
Cities in McClain County, Oklahoma
Cities in Grady County, Oklahoma
Cities in Oklahoma
Populated places established in 1907